Adobe Inc., originally called Adobe Systems Incorporated, is an American multinational computer software company incorporated in Delaware 
and headquartered in San Jose, California. It has historically specialized in software for the creation and publication of a wide range of content, including graphics, photography, illustration, animation, multimedia/video, motion pictures, and print. Its flagship products include Adobe Photoshop image editing software; Adobe Illustrator vector-based illustration software; Adobe Acrobat Reader and the Portable Document Format (PDF); and a host of tools primarily for audio-visual content creation, editing and publishing. Adobe offered a bundled solution of its products named Adobe Creative Suite, which evolved into a subscription software as a service (SaaS) offering named Adobe Creative Cloud. The company also expanded into digital marketing software and in 2021 was considered one of the top global leaders in Customer Experience Management (CXM).

Adobe was founded in December 1982 by John Warnock and Charles Geschke, who established the company after leaving Xerox PARC to develop and sell the PostScript page description language. In 1985, Apple Computer licensed PostScript for use in its LaserWriter printers, which helped spark the desktop publishing revolution. Adobe later developed animation and multimedia through its acquisition of Macromedia, from which it acquired Adobe Flash; video editing and compositing software with Adobe Premiere, later known as Adobe Premiere Pro; low-code web development with Adobe Muse; and a suite of software for digital marketing management.

As of 2022, Adobe has more than 26,000 employees worldwide. Adobe also has major development operations in the United States in Newton, New York City, Arden Hills, Lehi, Seattle, Austin and San Francisco. It also has major development operations in Noida and Bangalore in India.

History

The company was started in John Warnock's garage. The name of the company, Adobe, comes from Adobe Creek in Los Altos, California, a stream which ran behind Warnock's house. That creek is so named because of the type of clay found there (Adobe being a Spanish word for Mudbrick), which alludes to the creative nature of the company's software. Adobe's corporate logo features a stylized "A" and was designed by graphic designer Marva Warnock, John Warnock's wife. In 2020, the company updated its visual identity, including updating its logo to a single color, an all-red logo that is warmer and more contemporary.

Steve Jobs attempted to buy the company for $5 million in 1982, but Warnock and Geschke refused. Their investors urged them to work something out with Jobs, so they agreed to sell him shares worth 19 percent of the company. Jobs paid a five-times multiple of their company's valuation at the time, plus a five-year license fee for PostScript, in advance. The purchase and advance made Adobe the first company in the history of Silicon Valley to become profitable in its first year.

Warnock and Geschke considered various business options including a copy-service business and a turnkey system for office printing. Then they chose to focus on developing specialized printing software and created the Adobe PostScript page description language.

PostScript was the first truly international standard for computer printing as it included algorithms describing the letter-forms of many languages. Adobe added kanji printer products in 1988. Warnock and Geschke were also able to bolster the credibility of PostScript by connecting with a typesetting manufacturer. They weren't able to work with Compugraphic, but then worked with Linotype to license the Helvetica and Times Roman fonts (through the Linotron 100). By 1987, PostScript had become the industry-standard printer language with more than 400 third-party software programs and licensing agreements with 19 printer companies.

Warnock described the language as "extensible" in its ability to apply graphic arts standards to office printing.

Adobe's first products after PostScript were digital fonts which they released in a proprietary format called Type 1, worked on by Bill Paxton after he left Stanford. Apple subsequently developed a competing standard, TrueType, which provided full scalability and precise control of the pixel pattern created by the font's outlines, and licensed it to Microsoft.

In the mid-1980s, Adobe entered the consumer software market with Illustrator, a vector-based drawing program for the Apple Macintosh. Illustrator, which grew from the firm's in-house font-development software, helped popularize PostScript-enabled laser printers.

Adobe entered the NASDAQ Composite index in August 1986. Its revenue has grown from roughly $1 billion in 1999 to $4 billion in 2012. Adobe's fiscal years run from December to November. For example, the 2020 fiscal year ended on November 27, 2020.

In 1989, Adobe introduced what was to become its flagship product, a graphics editing program for the Macintosh called Photoshop. Stable and full-featured, Photoshop 1.0 was ably marketed by Adobe and soon dominated the market.

In 1993, Adobe introduced PDF, the Portable Document Format, and its Adobe Acrobat and Reader software. PDF is now an International Standard: ISO 32000-1:2008.

In December 1991, Adobe released Adobe Premiere, which Adobe rebranded as Adobe Premiere Pro in 2003. In 1992, Adobe acquired OCR Systems, Inc. In 1994, Adobe acquired the Aldus Corporation and added PageMaker and After Effects to its product line later in the year; it also controls the TIFF file format. In the same year, Adobe acquired LaserTools Corp and Compution Inc. In 1995, Adobe added FrameMaker, the long-document DTP application, to its product line after Adobe acquired Frame Technology Corp. In 1996, Adobe acquired Ares Software Corp. In 2002, Adobe acquired Canadian company Accelio (also known as JetForm).

In May 2003, Adobe purchased audio editing and multitrack recording software Cool Edit Pro from Syntrillium Software for $16.5 million, as well as a large loop library called "Loopology". Adobe then renamed Cool Edit Pro to "Adobe Audition" and included it in the Creative Suite.

On December 3, 2005, Adobe acquired its main rival, Macromedia, in a stock swap valued at about $3.4 billion, adding ColdFusion, Contribute, Captivate, Breeze (rebranded as Adobe Connect), Director, Dreamweaver, Fireworks, Flash, FlashPaper, Flex, FreeHand, HomeSite, JRun, Presenter, and Authorware to Adobe's product line.

Adobe released Adobe Media Player in April 2008. On April 27, Adobe discontinued development and sales of its older HTML/web development software, GoLive, in favor of Dreamweaver. Adobe offered a discount on Dreamweaver for GoLive users and supports those who still use GoLive with online tutorials and migration assistance. On June 1, Adobe launched Acrobat.com, a series of web applications geared for collaborative work. Creative Suite 4, which includes Design, Web, Production Premium, and Master Collection came out in October 2008 in six configurations at prices from about US$1,700 to $2,500 or by individual application. The Windows version of Photoshop includes 64-bit processing. On December 3, 2008, Adobe laid off 600 of its employees (8% of the worldwide staff) citing the weak economic environment.

On September 15, 2009, Adobe Systems announced that it would acquire online marketing and web analytics company Omniture for $1.8 billion. The deal was completed on October 23, 2009. Former Omniture products were integrated into the Adobe Marketing Cloud.

On November 10, 2009, the company laid off a further 680 employees.

Adobe's 2010 was marked by continuing front-and-back arguments with Apple over the latter's non-support for Adobe Flash on its iPhone, iPad and other products. Former Apple CEO Steve Jobs claimed that Flash was not reliable or secure enough, while Adobe executives have argued that Apple wish to maintain control over the iOS platform. In April 2010, Steve Jobs published a post titled "Thoughts on Flash" where he outlined his thoughts on Flash and the rise of HTML 5.
In July 2010, Adobe bought Day Software integrating their line of CQ Products: WCM, DAM, SOCO, and Mobile

In January 2011, Adobe acquired DemDex, Inc. with the intent of adding DemDex's audience-optimization software to its online marketing suite. At Photoshop World 2011, Adobe unveiled a new mobile photo service. Carousel is a new application for iPhone, iPad, and Mac that uses Photoshop Lightroom technology for users to adjust and fine-tune images on all platforms. Carousel will also allow users to automatically sync, share and browse photos. The service was later renamed to "Adobe Revel".

In October 2011, Adobe acquired Nitobi Software, the makers of the mobile application development framework PhoneGap. As part of the acquisition, the source code of PhoneGap was submitted to the Apache Foundation, where it became Apache Cordova.

In November 2011, Adobe announced that they would cease development of Flash for mobile devices following version 11.1. Instead, it would focus on HTML 5 for mobile devices. In December 2011, Adobe announced that it entered into a definitive agreement to acquire privately held Efficient Frontier.

In December 2012, Adobe opened a new  corporate campus in Lehi, Utah.

In 2013, Adobe endured a major security breach. Vast portions of the source code for the company's software were stolen and posted online and over 150 million records of Adobe's customers have been made readily available for download. In 2012, about 40 million sets of payment card information were compromised by a hack of Adobe.

A class-action lawsuit alleging that the company suppressed employee compensation was filed against Adobe, and three other Silicon Valley-based companies in a California federal district court in 2013. In May 2014, it was revealed the four companies, Adobe, Apple, Google, and Intel had reached agreement with the plaintiffs, 64,000 employees of the four companies, to pay a sum of $324.5 million to settle the suit.

In March 2018, at Adobe Summit, the company and NVIDIA publicized a key association to quickly upgrade their industry-driving AI and profound learning innovations. Expanding on years of coordinated effort, the organizations will work to streamline the Adobe Sensei AI and machine learning structure for NVIDIA GPUs. The joint effort will speed time to showcase and enhance the execution of new Sensei-powered services for Adobe Creative Cloud and Experience Cloud clients and engineers.

Adobe and NVIDIA have co-operated for over 10 years on empowering GPU quickening for a wide arrangement of Adobe's creative and computerized encounter items. This incorporates Sensei-powered features, for example, auto lip-sync in Adobe Character Animator CC and face-aware editing in Photoshop CC, and also cloud-based AI/ML items and features, for example, picture investigation for Adobe Stock and Lightroom CC and auto-labeling in Adobe Experience Supervisor.

In May 2018, Adobe stated they would buy e-commerce services provider Magento Commerce from private equity firm Permira for $1.68 billion. This deal will help bolster its Experience Cloud business, which provides services including analytics, advertising, and marketing. The deal is closed on June 19, 2018.

In September 2018, Adobe announced its acquisition of marketing automation software company Marketo.

In October 2018, Adobe officially changed its name from Adobe Systems Incorporated to Adobe Inc.

In January 2019, Adobe announced its acquisition of 3D texturing company Allegorithmic.

In 2020, the annual Adobe Summit was canceled due to the COVID-19 pandemic. The event took place online and saw over 21 million total video views and over 2.2 million visits to the event website.

The software giant has imposed a ban on the political ads features on its digital advert sales platform as the United States presidential elections approach.

On November 9, 2020, Adobe announced it will spend US$1.5 billion to acquire Workfront, a provider of marketing collaboration software. The acquisition was completed in early December 2020.

On August 19, 2021, Adobe announced it had entered into a definitive agreement to acquire Frame.io, a leading cloud-based video collaboration platform. The transaction is valued at $1.275 billion and closed during the fourth quarter of Adobe's 2021 fiscal year.

On September 15, 2021, Adobe Inc formally announced that it will add payment services to its e-commerce platform this year, allowing merchants on their platform a method to accept payments including credit cards and PayPal. 

In September 2022, Adobe announced that it had agreed to buy the software design start-up Figma for $20billion. The cloud-based design software from Figma directly competes with Adobe XD. The deal faces regulatory scrutiny. In February 2023, it was announced the European Commission would review the acquisition under European Union merger regulation (EUMR).

Finances

Products

Adobe's currently supported roster of software, online services and file formats comprises the following:

Digital Marketing Management Software
 Adobe Experience Cloud, Adobe Experience Manager (AEM 6.2), XML Documentation add-on (for AEM), Mixamo
 Formats
 Portable Document Format (PDF), PDF's predecessor PostScript, ActionScript, Shockwave Flash (SWF), Flash Video (FLV), and Filmstrip (.flm)
 Web-hosted services
 Adobe Color, Photoshop Express, Acrobat.com, Behance and Adobe Spark
 Adobe Renderer
 Adobe Media Encoder
 Adobe Stock
 A microstock agency that presently provides over 57 million high-resolution, royalty-free images and videos available to license (via subscription or credit purchase methods). In 2015, Adobe acquired Fotolia, a stock content marketplace founded in 2005 by Thibaud Elziere, Oleg Tscheltzoff, and Patrick Chassany which operated in 23 countries. It is run as a stand-alone website.
 Adobe Experience Platform
 A family of content, development, and customer relationship management products, with what Adobe calls the "next generation" of its Sensei artificial intelligence and machine learning framework, introduced in March 2019.

Reception
Since 2000, Fortune has recognized Adobe as one of the 100 Best Companies to Work For. In 2021, Adobe was ranked 16th. Glassdoor recognized Adobe as a Best Place to Work. In October 2021, Fast Company included Adobe on their Brands That Matter list. In October 2008, Adobe Systems Canada Inc. was named one of "Canada's Top 100 Employers" by Mediacorp Canada Inc. and was featured in Maclean's newsmagazine.

Adobe received a five-star rating from the Electronic Frontier Foundation with regards to its handling of government data requests in 2017.

Criticisms

Pricing
Adobe has been criticized for its pricing practices, with retail prices being up to twice as much in non-US countries. For example, it is significantly cheaper to pay for a return airfare ticket to the United States and purchase one particular collection of Adobe's software there than to buy it locally in Australia.

After Adobe revealed the pricing for the Creative Suite 3 Master Collection, which was £1,000 higher for European customers, a petition to protest over "unfair pricing" was published and signed by 10,000 users. In June 2009, Adobe further increased its prices in the UK by 10% in spite of weakening of the pound against the dollar, and UK users were not allowed to buy from the US store.

Adobe's Reader and Flash programs were listed on "The 10 most hated programs of all time" article by TechRadar.

Security 
Hackers have exploited vulnerabilities in Adobe programs, such as Adobe Reader, to gain unauthorized access to computers. Adobe's Flash Player has also been criticized for, among other things, suffering from performance, memory usage and security problems (see criticism of Flash Player). A report by security researchers from Kaspersky Lab criticized Adobe for producing the products having top 10 security vulnerabilities.

Observers noted that Adobe was spying on its customers by including spyware in the Creative Suite 3 software and quietly sending user data to a firm named Omniture. When users became aware, Adobe explained what the suspicious software did and admitted that they: "could and should do a better job taking security concerns into account". When a security flaw was later discovered in Photoshop CS5, Adobe sparked outrage by saying it would leave the flaw unpatched, so anyone who wanted to use the software securely would have to pay for an upgrade. Following a fierce backlash Adobe decided to provide the software patch.

Adobe has been criticized for pushing unwanted software including third-party browser toolbars and free virus scanners, usually as part of the Flash update process, and for pushing a third-party scareware program designed to scare users into paying for unneeded system repairs.

Customer data breach
On October 3, 2013, the company initially revealed that 2.9 million customers' sensitive and personal data was stolen in a security breach which included encrypted credit card information. Adobe later admitted that 38 million active users have been affected and the attackers obtained access to their IDs and encrypted passwords, as well as to many inactive Adobe accounts. The company did not make it clear if all the personal information was encrypted, such as email addresses and physical addresses, though data privacy laws in 44 states require this information to be encrypted.

A 3.8 GB file stolen from Adobe and containing 152 million usernames, reversibly encrypted passwords and unencrypted password hints was posted on AnonNews.org. LastPass, a password security firm, said that Adobe failed to use best practices for securing the passwords and has not salted them. Another security firm, Sophos, showed that Adobe used a weak encryption method permitting the recovery of a lot of information with very little effort. According to IT expert Simon Bain, Adobe has failed its customers and 'should hang their heads in shame'.

Many of the credit cards were tied to the Creative Cloud software-by-subscription service. Adobe offered its affected US customers a free membership in a credit monitoring service, but no similar arrangements have been made for non-US customers. When a data breach occurs in the US, penalties depend on the state where the victim resides, not where the company is based.

After stealing the customers' data, cyber-thieves also accessed Adobe's source code repository, likely in mid-August 2013. Because hackers acquired copies of the source code of Adobe proprietary products, they could find and exploit any potential weaknesses in its security, computer experts warned. Security researcher Alex Holden, chief information security officer of Hold Security, characterized this Adobe breach, which affected Acrobat, ColdFusion and numerous other applications, as "one of the worst in US history". Adobe also announced that hackers stole parts of the source code of Photoshop, which according to commentators could allow programmers to copy its engineering techniques and would make it easier to pirate Adobe's expensive products.

Published on a server of a Russian-speaking hacker group, the "disclosure of encryption algorithms, other security schemes, and software vulnerabilities can be used to bypass protections for individual and corporate data" and may have opened the gateway to new generation zero-day attacks. Hackers already used ColdFusion exploits to make off with usernames and encrypted passwords of PR Newswire's customers, which has been tied to the Adobe security breach. They also used a ColdFusion exploit to breach Washington state court and expose up to 200,000 Social Security numbers.

Anti-competitive practices
In 1994, Adobe acquired Aldus Corp., a software vendor that sold FreeHand, a competing product. FreeHand was direct competition to Adobe Illustrator, Adobe's flagship vector-graphics editor. The Federal Trade Commission intervened and forced Adobe to sell FreeHand back to Altsys, and also banned Adobe from buying back FreeHand or any similar program for the next 10 years (1994–2004). Altsys was then bought by Macromedia, which released versions 5 to 11. When Adobe acquired Macromedia in December 2005, it stalled development of FreeHand in 2007, effectively rendering it obsolete. With FreeHand and Illustrator, Adobe controlled the only two products that compete in the professional illustration program market for Macintosh operating systems.

In 2011, a group of 5,000 FreeHand graphic designers convened under the banner Free FreeHand, and filed a civil antitrust complaint in the US District Court for the Northern District of California against Adobe. The suit alleged that Adobe has violated federal and state antitrust laws by abusing its dominant position in the professional vector graphic illustration software market and that Adobe has engaged in a series of exclusionary and anti-competitive acts and strategies designed to kill FreeHand, the dominant competitor to Adobe's Illustrator software product, instead of competing on the basis of product merit according to the principals of free market capitalism. Adobe had no response to the claims and the lawsuit was eventually settled. The FreeHand community believes Adobe should release the product to an open-source community if it cannot update it internally.

, on its FreeHand product page, Adobe stated, "While we recognize FreeHand has a loyal customer base, we encourage users to migrate to the new Adobe Illustrator CS4 software which supports both PowerPC and Intel-based Macs and Microsoft Windows XP and Windows Vista." , the FreeHand page no longer exists; instead, it simply redirects to the Illustrator page. Adobe's software FTP server still contains a directory for FreeHand, but it is empty.

Cancellation fees 
In April 2021, Adobe received criticism from Twitter users for the company's cancellation fees after a customer shared a tweet showing they had been charged a $291.45 cancellation fee for their Adobe Creative Cloud subscription. Many also showed their cancellation fees for Adobe Creative Cloud, with this leading to many encouraging piracy of Adobe products and/or purchase of alternatives with lower prices or using FOSS software instead. Furthermore, there have been reports that with changing subscriptions it is possible to avoid paying this fee.

Chief executive officers
John Warnock (1982-2000)
Bruce Chizen (2000-2007)
Shantanu Narayen (2007–present)

See also

 Adobe MAX
 Digital rights management (DRM)
 List of acquisitions by Adobe
 United States v. Elcom Ltd.

References

External links

 

 

 
1982 establishments in California
Companies based in San Jose, California
Companies listed on the Nasdaq
Multinational companies headquartered in the United States
Software companies based in the San Francisco Bay Area
Software companies established in 1982
Type foundries
American companies established in 1982
1980s initial public offerings
Software companies of the United States